Hans Friedrich Zacher (22 June 1928 – 18 February 2015) was a German academician. He was a professor at the Ludwig Maximilian University of Munich and was the President of the Max Planck Society from 1990 till 1996.

Biography
Zacher was born in Erlach am Inn in Germany and attended school in nearby Simbach. Later he studied law at the Universities of Bamberg, Erlangen and Munich. He was an ordinary member of the Pontifical Academy of Social Sciences.

Works
 The reestablishment of the parliamentary system after the Second World War. (1952) – doctoral thesis under Hans Nawiasky. 
 The constitutional law of the state social intervention. (1962) – Habilitation topic.

Decorations and awards
 1983 Bavarian Order of Merit
 1991 Honorary Doctorate from the Catholic University of Leuven
 1992 Grand Cross of Merit of the Federal Republic of Germany
 1995 Honorary Doctorate from the University of Wrocław
 1995 Bavarian Maximilian Order for Science and Art
 1996 Honorary doctorate from the Weizmann Institute of Science, Rehovot (Israel)
 1997 Honorary Doctorate from the University of Szeged
 1998 Harnack Medal of the Max Planck Society
 2001 Honorary Doctorate, University of Athens
 2001 Austrian Cross of Honour for Science and Art, 1st class
 2004 Officer of the National Order of Merit (France)

External links
 Zacher's page at the Pontifical Academy of Social Sciences

References

1928 births
2015 deaths
People from Rottal-Inn
Jurists from Bavaria
Max Planck Society people
Academic staff of the Ludwig Maximilian University of Munich
Commanders Crosses of the Order of Merit of the Federal Republic of Germany
Members of the Pontifical Academy of Social Sciences
Recipients of the Austrian Cross of Honour for Science and Art, 1st class
Officers of the Ordre national du Mérite